Rolt is a surname, and may refer to:

Sir Edward Bayntun-Rolt, 1st Baronet
Sir Andrew Bayntun-Rolt, 2nd Baronet
Edward Rolt (c.1629–1698), soldier, diplomat and friend of Samuel Pepys
Sir Thomas Rolt (1631–1710), Governor of Bombay
Edward Rolt (1686–1722), MP for Chippenham
Mary Constantia Rolt (d. 1767), granddaughter of Edward Rolt
Samuel Rolt (1671-1717), MP for Bedford, half brother to Edward Rolt (1686-1722) 
Richard Rolt (bapt 1724, d. 1770), writer, poet, and librettist 
Sir John Rolt (British Army officer), (died 1856) 
Cecil Rolt, Dean of Cape Town 
Sir John Rolt (1804–1871), English lawyer and Attorney-General
L. T. C. Rolt, also known as Tom Rolt, (1910–1974), English writer and biographer
Sonia Rolt (1919–2014), campaigner for the Inland Waterways Association and wife of L. T. C. Rolt
Peter Rolt (1798–1882), British businessman and politician
Stuart Peter Rolt (1862–1933), general in the British Army
Tony Rolt (1918–2008), English Formula One driver

English-language surnames
Lists of people by surname